Walter Herbert "Eckie" Eckersall (June 17, 1883 – March 24, 1930) was an American college football player, official, and sportswriter for the Chicago Tribune.

He played for the Maroons of the University of Chicago, and was elected to the College Football Hall of Fame in 1951. Eckersall was selected as the quarterback for Walter Camp's "All-Time All-America Team" honoring the greatest college football players during the sport's formative years.  He was selected to Camp's All-American teams in 1904, 1905, and 1906.

Early life
Walter Eckersall was born in Chicago on June 17, 1883. He grew up in its Woodlawn neighborhood just south of the University of Chicago.  His talent emerged at Hyde Park High School, where he dashed  in 10.0 seconds, an Illinois record for 25 years, and excelled on the football field.  In 1903, he quarterbacked Hyde Park to an undefeated season and then led the squad to a 105–0 trouncing of Brooklyn Polytechnic at Marshall Field on December 5 to claim the unofficial national high school football championship.

Eckersall later wrote about his years at Hyde Park in a column picked up for national syndication in 1918. Much of the article was about African American player and World War I veteran Lieutenant Samuel Ransom.

Eckersall was highly recruited out of high school by both Fielding Yost of Michigan and Amos Alonzo Stagg of Chicago.  Stagg resorted to chicanery, snatching Eckersall off a train platform to keep him from attending a recruitment rendezvous arranged by Michigan coaches in Ann Arbor in 1904.

College career
In Eckersall, Stagg saw the promise of "a selfless performer, marked by complete dedication" to victory.  During his career, Eckersall led Chicago to a  record, outscoring their opponents  The two losses were to Michigan in 1904 and to Minnesota in 1906. The tie was a  stalemate with Illinois in 1904.

1905
In 1905, the sophomore quarterback led the Maroons to a national championship. In the final game of the season on Thursday, November 30, Chicago and Michigan met in a battle of undefeated, Western Conference powerhouses in front of 27,000 spectators, at that time the largest crowd to view a football game, at Chicago's Marshall Field.

The game was a punting duel between Eckersall and Michigan's John Garrels; and was scoreless until early in the third quarter when a Michigan punt and Chicago penalty pinned Chicago inside its own 10-yard line. On third down, as Eckersall attempted to punt, he encountered a fearsome rush, but evaded the Michigan tacklers and was able to scramble to the 22-yard line and a first down.

After three more first downs, the drive stalled and Chicago was forced to punt again. Eckersall's booming punt carried into the end zone where it was caught by Michigan's William Dennison Clark who attempted to run the ball out.  He advanced the ball forward to the one-yard line, but was hit hard by Art Badenoch and then was brought back inside his own end zone by Mark Catlin for a two-point safety. Under the rules of the time, forward progress was not credited, and a ball carrier could be carried backwards or forwards until he was down.  The rest of the third and fourth quarters continued as a defensive stalemate.  Chicago's  victory snapped Michigan's 56-game unbeaten streak and gave Chicago the national championship for 1905.  It is one of the first game's referred to as a "Game of the Century."

As a tragic note to this game, Clark received the blame for the Michigan loss, and in 1932 he shot himself through the heart. In a suicide note to his wife he reportedly expressed the hope that his "final play" would be of some benefit in atoning for his error at Marshall Field.

Later life

After his playing days, Eckersall remained a prominent figure in football.  He had a successful dual career as a sportswriter for the Chicago Tribune and as a game official. As a  referee, Eckersall was considered one of the best and officiated at many high-profile games. Highly regarded as an authority on football, he selected the Chicago Tribune'''s all star team;  his "All Western" eleven carried prestige.

Eckersall is also a footnote in the story of Knute Rockne, and the well-documented history of Notre Dame, because of his presence at many of their games.  Eckersall was an idol of Rockne, who grew up in Chicago and watched Eckersall play in high school and in college. Rockne was quoted as saying "The first time I learned a football was not only something to kick, but something to think with, was when I saw a great football player in action."

Death
Eckersall's boozing and carousing often contradicted Stagg's prescription of football as a surefire builder of moral character. Stagg gradually distanced himself from his greatest player, especially when Eckersall reneged on a $20 debt and was later featured in a national ad campaign for cigarettes—a habit Stagg regarded as sinful. In March 1930, Eckersall was hospitalized for illnesses associated with his hard living, Stagg came to his bedside with the firm advice to "turn over a new leaf." "Eckie" promised his old coach that he would; however, the former football star died of cirrhosis of the liver and pneumonia on March 24 at the age of 43. The cause of death was reported as a heart attack in the Chicago Tribune'' the next day.

Eckersall's funeral on March 27 at Holy Cross Church, five blocks south of the university, was attended by fifteen hundred. At 65th & Maryland, the parish church was built on the site where he first played sandlot football as a child.   He was buried at nearby Oak Woods Cemetery, next to his parents.

Legacy
In 1949, The Chicago Public Schools constructed a sporting facility in South Chicago at 2423 East 82nd Street, named "Walter Eckersall Stadium." 

References

External links
 
 University of Chicago Magazine, October 1995, Legends of the Fall 3 at magazine.uchicago.edu
 Walter Eckersall, pregame notes, 1905 at www.lib.uchicago.edu
Chicago Park District – Eckersall Playground Park

1883 births
1930 deaths
American football drop kickers
American football officials
American football punters
American football quarterbacks
Chicago Maroons football players
St. Viator Irish football coaches
All-American college football players
College Football Hall of Fame inductees
Sportspeople from Chicago
Players of American football from Chicago
Deaths from cirrhosis
Deaths from pneumonia in Illinois
Sportswriters from Illinois
Hyde Park Academy High School alumni